Karli Faneva (born 20 May 1998) is a New Zealand rugby union player. She made her debut for New Zealand against Canada in the 2019 Women's Rugby Super Series in San Diego. She then earned her second cap in the match against France in round three of the Super Series.

Biography 
Faneva debuted for Waikato against Bay of Plenty in the 2016 Farah Palmer Cup season. In 2019 she played for the Bay of Plenty and was one of 29 players who were offered a Black Ferns contract that year. She was named in Bay of Plenty's squad for the 2021 Farah Palmer Cup season.

Faneva was named in the  side that faced  in a pre-season match ahead of the inaugural season of Super Rugby Aupiki.

References

External links 

 Black Ferns Profile

1998 births
Living people
New Zealand female rugby union players
New Zealand women's international rugby union players